Björn Borg defeated Vitas Gerulaitis in the final, 6–2, 6–2 to win the singles title at the 1979 Colgate-Palmolive Masters.

John McEnroe was the defending champion, but lost to Borg in the semifinals.

Draw

Finals

Group A
 Standings are determined by: 1. number of wins; 2. number of matches; 3. in two-players-ties, head-to-head records; 4. in three-players-ties, percentage of sets won, or of games won; 5. steering-committee decision.

Group B
 Standings are determined by: 1. number of wins; 2. number of matches; 3. in two-players-ties, head-to-head records; 4. in three-players-ties, percentage of sets won, or of games won; 5. steering-committee decision.

See also
ATP World Tour Finals appearances

References
1979 Masters-Singles

Singles